Nambiyur was assembly constituency in Tamil Nadu. The elections conducted in the constituency and winners are listed below.

Members of Legislative Assembly

Election results

1962

1957

1952

References

External links

Former assembly constituencies of Tamil Nadu